Leivaditis, Λειβαδίτης is a Greek surname. Notable people with the surname include:

Tasos Leivaditis (1922–1988), Greek poet
Thanos Leivaditis (1934–2005), Greek actor and screenwriter

See also
Ioannis Leivatidis

Greek-language surnames